Play (stylized as >play) is a Canadian news magazine series, focusing on pop culture and entertainment, which aired on CBC Newsworld between 2002 and 2005. The show was hosted by Jian Ghomeshi, a former member of pop group Moxy Früvous. The show initially aired weekly. Then themed episodes aired once every several weeks. However, the show was cancelled due to poor ratings.

References

External links

CBC News Network original programming
Entertainment news shows in Canada
2002 Canadian television series debuts
2005 Canadian television series endings
2000s Canadian television news shows
English-language television shows
Television news program articles using incorrect naming style